Pig Earth is the first novel by John Berger in the Into Their Labours trilogy. Once in Europa, and Lilac and Flag followed in the trilogy.

1979 British novels
Pantheon Books books